Agarala Eswara Reddi  (also written as Agarala Eswara Reddy; 28 December 1933 – 16 February 2020) was an Indian writer and politician from Andhra Pradesh belonging to Indian National Congress. He served as the speaker and deputy speaker of the Andhra Pradesh Legislative Assembly.

Biography
Reddi was born on 28 December 1933 at Thukivakam in Chittor. He was elected as a legislator of the  Andhra Pradesh Legislative Assembly from Tirupati in 1967 and 1978.

Reddi served as the deputy speaker of the Andhra Pradesh Legislative Assembly from 27 March 1981 to 6 September 1982. He also served as the speaker of the Andhra Pradesh Legislative Assembly from 7 September 1982 to 16 January 1983. Besides politics he also authored seven books on public affairs.

Reddi died on 16 February 2020 at the age of 86.

References

1933 births
2020 deaths
Indian National Congress politicians from Andhra Pradesh
Andhra Pradesh MLAs 1967–1972
Andhra Pradesh MLAs 1978–1983
Deputy Speakers of the Andhra Pradesh Legislative Assembly
Speakers of the Andhra Pradesh Legislative Assembly
People from Chittoor district
Writers from Andhra Pradesh